The Sword and the Sickle is a novel by Mulk Raj Anand first published in 1942. Like his other novels, this one also deals with the topic of social and political structures, specifically, the rise of Communism. The title for the book was given to Anand by George Orwell. The novel was in keeping with British and American writings of the time. The book was the final part of the trilogy that included The Village and Across the Black Waters.

References

Novels by Mulk Raj Anand
1942 novels